Goghovit is a village in the Ashotsk Municipality of the Shirak Province of Armenia. The town's church dates from 1860. The Statistical Committee of Armenia reported its population was 389 in 2010, down from 396 at the 2001 census.

Demographics
The population of the village since 1831 is as follows:

References 

Communities in Shirak Province
Populated places in Shirak Province